Santiam High School is a public high school in Mill City, Oregon, United States. It was turned into a Junior/Senior High School when the Gates Elementary School was shut down due to budget cuts.

Academics
In 2008, 52% of the school's seniors received their high school diploma. Of 56 students, 29 graduated, 15 dropped out, 7 received a modified diploma, and 5 are still in high school.

References

High schools in Linn County, Oregon
Public high schools in Oregon